Large-billed Sabota lark may refer to:

 Certhilauda subcoronata bradshawi, a subspecies of the Karoo long-billed lark 
 Sabota lark, a species of lark